Century Park is an 8.40-hectare, public park located downtown Haikou, in the Longhua district of the city, Hainan Province, China. It is located northwest of Binhai Park and east of Evergreen Park. The Haikou Century Bridge travels over part of it. 

The park was completed in October 2013 and cost approximately 28.28 million RMB to build.

Layout

Century Park consists of a grassy area and a large, open area at the west. The park's west side meets Haikou Bay while the north side is at the mouth of the Haidian River.

Events
On May 28, 2017, there was a concert featuring Jay Chou.

References

Parks in Haikou
2013 establishments in China
Tourist attractions in Haikou